Joshua Gmayenaam Makubu (born 12 September 1980) is a Ghanaian politician. He is Minister of Oti Region in Ghana. President Nana Akufo-Addo nominated him for the position. He is the second person with a disability to be appointed as a Ghanaian minister.

Background 
He is from Nkwanta South. He had one leg surgically amputated when he was either 8 or 9 years old. He attended EP Senior High School in Saboba, Northern Region, before enrolling at Kwame Nkrumah University of Science and Technology. He graduated with a BSc. in Actuarial Science. He later earned a MPhil in Business Administration at the University of Ghana. He is pursuing a PhD in Finance at University of Ghana Business School and also has a Higher National Diploma in statistics. He works as a teacher and an advocate.

Politics 
He is a member of the New Patriotic Party, for whom he began serving as regional secretary in 2018. His predecessor in office was Nana Kwasi Owusu-Yeboah, the former and first Oti Regional Minister.

References 

New Patriotic Party politicians
Ghanaian politicians
Living people
1980 births